Qayamat: City Under Threat is an Indian Hindi-language action thriller film directed by Harry Baweja released on 11 July 2003. It is a remake of the 1996 film The Rock.

The film was an average at the box office upon its release. The action scenes and story of the movie were so highly praised that the demand from fans for a sequel was quite high. The film completed 100 days on single screen theatres in Mumbai, Indore, Bhopal, Delhi.

Plot 
The Central Bureau of Investigation (CBI) has assigned the case of three terrorists to honest CBI officer Akram Sheikh (Sunil Shetty). The three terrorists are two brothers Ali and Abbas Ramani (Sanjay Kapoor and Arbaaz Khan) and their common girlfriend, Laila (Isha Koppikar). They are accomplices of a plan masterminded by an evil Pakistani military man named Brigadier Rashid (Deep Dhillon) who is the leader of ISI (Inter-Services Intelligence). Ali, Abbas, and Laila hitch a plan to extort money from the Indian government, leave in a ship to Pakistan and take asylum from them. They take control of Elphinston Jail, in the city of Mumbai and using the help of a corrupt scientist, Gopal (Chunky Pandey), who is a member of a team headed by scientist Rahul (Aashish Chaudhary), investigating the effects of a deadly virus which could kill any living organism within a 3-kilometer radius, they load three missiles with the virus. They then take a group of 213 tourists hostage in the jail, including Rahul's girlfriend Sheetal (Riya Sen) and demand a ransom of 1500 crores from the government within 24 hours, failing which they will release the missiles into major water bodies in Mumbai, thus creating an apocalypse (Qayamat).

Akram asks the Chief Minister to allow him to release Rachit (Ajay Devgn), a man who has previous experience of escaping from Elphinston Jail, a feat which has never been accomplished in history, to get help in entering the jail, through the very route which he had used to escape. Rachit is a man who has been silent for a long time now, owing to the fact that the love of his life, Sapna (Neha Dhupia), was killed the night he was arrested. The main point of note here was that Rachit was an associate of Ali and Abbas and had been double-crossed by them (and another associate whom he killed after escaping from jail), leading to his arrest. The brothers had also apparently killed Sapna. However, unknown to Rachit, she survived. Akram and his team, which includes Rahul use Rachit's help to enter the jail through, first, an underwater route, and then a maze of tunnels through which Rachit had escaped. They successfully get to the septic tank of the jail, but the corrupt Home Minister of Maharashtra who is helping the terrorists for personal gain gives the news of the team's arrival to Ali and Abbas, whose men kill the whole team in a brutal gunfight, resulting in Akram's death as well. Rahul and Rachit are the only ones that are alive.

Rachit suffers from severe mental trauma, the effects of which can be seen every 12 hours, whereby he starts hallucinating and sees odd shadows everywhere. He has even lost his power of speech due to this.  These effects are taken away, when Sapna, who is arrives at the CBI headquarters, calls him on a walkie-talkie and assures him of her true love and the fact that she is indeed alive. This is enough for Rachit as he gets up and single-handedly takes out all of Ali and Abbas's men, one by one. Sheetal escapes captivity and joins Rahul and Rachit. 

Rahul is able to disarm the missiles one by one and kills Gopal. However, while Rachit is taking out his remaining men and beating his brother, Ali gets to the last missile and tries to release it. Laila captures Rahul on gunpoint, saying she will kill Rahul if Rachit does not leave Abbas. Rahul asks Rachit to let him die, but, Rachit shoots Rahul in the leg. Rahul falls down, and Rachit shoots Laila in the head, killing her. Abbas tries to escape, but Rachit kills him. Rachit disarms the last missile and kills Ali. Thus, the city of Mumbai and the hostages are saved in the nick of time. Maharashtra's corrupt Home Minister is arrested and Rashid is killed in an air strike. At the end of the film, Rachit reunites with Sapna and reveals that he can talk.

Cast 
Ajay Devgan as Rachit, Sapna's love interest
Suniel Shetty as Akram Sheikh, CBI officer
Neha Dhupia as Sapna, Rachit's love interest
Sanjay Kapoor as Abbas Rehmani, Ali's brother
Arbaaz Khan as Ali Rehmani, Abbas' brother
Isha Koppikar as Laila, Abbas and Ali's girlfriend
Aashish Chaudhary as Rahul Gupta, Sheetal's boyfriend
Deep Dhillon as Brigadier Rashid-ul-Haq
Riya Sen as Sheetal, Rahul's girlfriend
Chunky Pandey as Gopal
Ayub Khan as Billu (special appearance)
Anjan Srivastav as CM of Maharashtra
Kulbhushan Kharbanda as CBI Chief Khurana
Govind Namdev as Maharashtra Home Minister
Raveena Tandon as herself (special appearance)

Production
Harry Baweja had offered the leading role to Urmila Matondkar but it did not materialise due to Urmila's date problems. The film marked the comeback of Chunky Pandey to Bollywood after a stint in Bengali films since the late 1990s. Neha Dhupia's voice was dubbed by dubbing artist Rajanika Ganguly Mukherjee as the director thought her voice did not suit her character perfectly.

The Elphinston Jail of Mumbai copy described in it was originally situated in Diu Island, Daman & Diu, U.T, India.

Soundtrack
The music is composed by Nadeem Shravan and the lyrics are by Sameer. According to the Indian trade website Box Office India, with around 21,00,000 units sold, this film's soundtrack album was the year's fifth highest-selling.

References

External links 

2003 films
Films about terrorism in India
Indian remakes of American films
2000s Hindi-language films
2003 action thriller films
Films scored by Nadeem–Shravan
Pakistan Navy in fiction
Films directed by Harry Baweja
Indian action thriller films
Films shot in Daman and Diu